Marek Grabowski (born 20 January 1964) is a former Polish footballer who played as a forward.

Career
He began his career in Poland with Metal Grodków before moving to Moto Jelcz Oława. 

In 1991, he joined the North York Rockets of the Canadian Soccer League, where he scored 10 goals in 28 appearances. He won the Top Newcomer Award for the 1991 CSL season.

Afterwards, he returned to Poland, where he played for Moto Jelcz Oława and Polar Wrocław. In 2001, he joined Śląsk Wrocław, but returned to Polar soon after. He served as team captain for Polar and became a player-coach in 2003.

In 2004, after head coach Tadeusz Pawłowski was dismissed, he was one of four players removed from Polar. While no reason was given for his removal, it was unofficially known that the club managers did not like that he was one of a few players who consistently demanded payment of outstanding salaries. He received a letter from the club that he was no longer to play for the club, but was barred from training for any other team without their permission, including the reserves, despite previously saying he would be allowed to play for the second team. Grabowski submitted a letter to Polar and the Polish Football Association, demanding the termination of his contract due to unpaid wages. Late in January, the training ban was revoked and he was free to train with other clubs. In February, his contract was officially terminated by mutual consent. 

Afterwards, he returned to Śląsk Wrocław. In 2004, he was charged in connection with a match-fixing scandal in connection with his former club Polar.

References

External links
Marek Grabowski Stats
Marek Grabowski Stats

1964 births
Living people
People from Brzeg County
Sportspeople from Opole Voivodeship
North York Rockets players
Polish expatriate sportspeople in Canada
Expatriate soccer players in Canada
Association football forwards
Polar Wrocław players
Śląsk Wrocław players
Polish footballers
Polish expatriate footballers
Canadian Soccer League (1987–1992) players